Big Tree or variation, may refer to:

Trees
 Big Tree (Washington tree), a Ponderosa pine tree that formerly stood in Washington State, U.S.
 Big Tree at Victoria Falls, a large baobab near Victoria Falls in Zimbabwe
 The Big Tree, 400 year old national champion in Missouri, U.S.
 The Big Tree, Rockport, a live oak near Rockport, Texas, U.S.
 Big Tree, the tallest tree known to the public in northern California's Redwoods
 The Senator (tree), the oldest pond cypress tree in the United States

People
 Big Tree (Kiowa leader) (1847–1927), Kiowa war leader 
 Chief John Big Tree (1877–1967), Seneca Nation chief

Places in the United States
 Big Trees, California
 Big Tree Station, Mariposa, California
 Big Tree Station, a former name of Wawona, California
 Big Tree, New York

Other uses
 Big Tree (novel), a children's novel written and illustrated by Mary and Conrad Buff
 The Big Trees, a 1952 film
 Big Trees Lodge, a hotel in Yosemite, California, U.S.
 Big Tree Records, a record label
 Treaty of Big Tree, a late 18th century Indian treaty between the Six Nations and United States

See also

 Big Banyan Tree, in Kethohalli, Karnataka, India
 Calaveras Big Trees (disambiguation)
 
 
 
 
 Trees (disambiguation)
 Tree (disambiguation)